Amy W. Knight (born July 10, 1946) is an American historian of the Soviet Union and Russia. She has been described by The New York Times as "the West's foremost scholar" of the KGB.

Life and career
Amy Knight was born in Chicago in 1946. She gained a Bachelor of Arts (BA) at the University of Michigan. She went on to gain a Doctor of Philosophy (PhD) in Russian politics at the London School of Economics and Political Science (LSE) in 1977. She taught at the LSE, the Paul H. Nitze School of Advanced International Studies at Johns Hopkins University, George Washington University and at Carleton University. She also worked for eighteen years at the U.S. Library of Congress as a specialist in Russian and Soviet affairs. Knight also writes for The New York Review of Books, The Times Literary Supplement, The Globe and Mail, and The Daily Beast.

In 1993–94, she was a fellow at the Woodrow Wilson International Center for Scholars.

See also
Magnitsky Act

Bibliography

Knight, Amy (2017). Orders to Kill: The Putin Regime and Political Murder. St. Martin's Press.

References

External links

1946 births
Living people
Alumni of the London School of Economics
21st-century American historians
American women historians
Academic staff of Carleton University
George Washington University faculty
Johns Hopkins University faculty
The New York Review of Books people
University of Michigan alumni
20th-century American historians
20th-century American women writers
21st-century American women writers
Writers from Chicago
Historians from Illinois